François Marcellin Bernard-Valville (6 February 1767 – 15 October 1828) was a French playwright and librettist.

Biography 
The son of a lawyer of Clermont, his studies led him to theater, where he played a few years under the name Bernard-Valville, before trying to playwriting with some success. Arrived in Paris in 1795, he presented his plays in several Parisian theaters. But the career of arms attracted him: he accompanied General Decaen to Pondicherry and Mauritius Island when the latter became governor, and continued his career in France until the collapse of the Empire. The cloudy period following the Hundred Days encouraged him to return to Mauritius where he was appointed deputy headmaster of the Royal College in Port-Louis, where he also taught rhetoric. He would return to Paris only to die there.

Jacques Bernard, also a military (captain of hussards) and poet died in 1842, was his twin brother.

His plays were presented on the most important Parisian stages of his time including the Théâtre de la Gaîté and the Théâtre Feydeau.

Works 
1794: Les Deux perruques, comédie nouvelle in one act and in verse
c.1795: Le Miguelet, one-act opera
1799: Les Deux tableaux parlans ou le Dîner interrompu, one-act comedy in prose
1799: L'Horloge de bois, ou Un Trait d'humanité, one-act comedy, mingled with vaudevilles
1799: L'Épicière bel-esprit, one-act comedy, in prose, with Étienne Gosse
1799: La Lanterne magique, ou le Retour des époux, one-act comedy
1799: Marcelin, one-act opera, in prose
1799: Le Petit Gagne-Petit, ou l'Erreur d'une mère, one-act comey, in prose, mingled with vaudevilles
1799: Pygmalion à Saint-Maur, one-act farce-anecdotique and vaudevilles, with Étienne Crétu and Gosse
1800: Augustine et Benjamin, ou le Sargines de village, one-act opéra comique, with Eugène Hus
1800: Kiki, ou l'Île imaginaire, three-act comedie-folie, in prose, with Hus
1800: Le trompeur trompé, one-act opéra comique, in prose, with Pierre Gaveaux
1801: Vert-Vert, ou le Perroquet de Nevers, one-act opéra comique, in prose
1810: Henriette et Adhémar, ou, La bataille de Fontenoy, with Louis-Charles Caigniez, three-act melodrama, in prose
1820: Épître à mon frère, en réponse à la sienne
1822: Le Dépit amoureux, comédie de Molière, remise in two acts by Bernard-Valville

Bibliography 
 Joseph Marie Quérard, La France littéraire ou dictionnaire bibliographique des savants..., 1839, (p. 34)
 Joann Elart, Catalogue des fonds musicaux conservés en Haute-Normandie, 2004, (p. 217)

References 

18th-century French dramatists and playwrights
19th-century French dramatists and playwrights
French opera librettists
1767 births
Writers from Clermont-Ferrand
1828 deaths